Loxbeare is a village and civil parish in Devon, England. The church is from the twelfth century and the tower is probably Norman. It is dedicated to St Michael and All Angels and is a grade II* listed building.

In the Doomsday Book Loxbeare is recorded as Lochesbera.

References

Villages in Mid Devon District